Carducci is an Italian surname. Notable people with the surname include:

 Bartolomeo Carducci (1560–1610), Florentine artist
 Giosuè Carducci (1835–1907), Italian poet
 Joe Carducci (born 1955), American writer and record producer
 Marco Carducci (born 1996), Canadian soccer player
 Michelangelo Carducci (16th century), Italian Renaissance painter
 Vincenzo Carducci (1576/78–1638), Florentine artist

Italian-language surnames